Ropica yapana is a species of beetle in the family Cerambycidae. It was described by Gressitt in 1956. It is known from Micronesia.

References

yapana
Beetles described in 1956